Shannon Francis (born April 19, 1959) is an American politician who has served in the Kansas House of Representatives from the 125th district since 2015.

References

1959 births
Living people
Republican Party members of the Kansas House of Representatives
21st-century American politicians
Kansas State University alumni
People from Liberal, Kansas